Pramod Agrahari (Nepali :प्रमोद अग्रहरि ) is a Nepali actor. He made his film debut from movie Uma. He is known for his films namely White Sun, Gangster Blues, Katha Kathmandu etc. He is the highest paid actor in the Nepalese film industry.

Filmography

Awards & Nominations

References

Living people
Nepalese male actors
Year of birth missing (living people)